The BBC Radio 4 programme Desert Island Discs invites guests to choose eight pieces of music which they would take with them to a hypothetical desert island. They are also invited to select a book of their choosing (in addition to the Bible or a comparable religious text for the guest, and the complete works of William Shakespeare), and one luxury item (provided it is inanimate and would not help them escape the island). The following is a list of episodes that have been broadcast since 2021, detailing the guest on each episode, their chosen book, and their luxury item.

2021

2022

2023

References

External links
Desert Island Discs at BBC Radio 4

Episodes 2021-present
Lists of British radio series episodes
2020s in the United Kingdom
2020s in British music